The 12th Lo Nuestro Awards ceremony, presented by Univision to honor the best Latin music of 1999 and 2000, took place on May 5, 2000, at a live presentation held at the James L. Knight Center in Miami, Florida. The ceremony was broadcast in the United States and Latin America by Univision.

During the ceremony, nineteen categories were presented. Winners were announced at the live event and included Mexican singer-songwriter Pepe Aguilar and  Puerto-Rican American singers Elvis Crespo and Ricky Martin receiving three competitive awards each. Aguilar earned the award for Regional Mexican Album of the Year, Crespo won for Tropical/Salsa Album of the Year, and the Pop Album of the Year was presented to American band Santana. A special tribute was given to Mexican singer Cristian Castro and the Excellence Award was received by Mexican performer Antonio Aguilar.

Background 
In 1989, the Lo Nuestro Awards were established by Univision, to recognize the most talented performers of Latin music. The nominees and winners were selected by a voting poll conducted among program directors of Spanish-language radio stations in the United States and the results were tabulated and certified by the accounting firm Arthur Andersen. The categories included are for the Pop, Tropical/Salsa, Regional Mexican and Music Video. The trophy awarded is shaped like a treble clef. The 12th Lo Nuestro Awards ceremony was held on May 5, 2000, in a live presentation held at the James L. Knight Center in Miami, Florida. The ceremony was broadcast in the United States and Latin America by Univision.

Winners and nominees 

Winners were announced before the live audience during the ceremony. American singer Marc Anthony was the most nominated performer, but ended the ceremony winning none. Anthony's nominations at the Tropical/Salsa Field (Male Singer and Song of the Year) were awarded to Puerto-Rican American Elvis Crespo, who also received the Album of the Year accolade for his second album Píntame; while his Pop Field nominations were handed to "Livin' la Vida Loca" by Ricky Martin for Song of the Year and Male Artist was also given to Martin. The English-language version of "Livin' la Vida Loca" was also nominated for a Grammy Award for Song of the Year at the 42nd Grammy Awards.

American band Santana received the Pop Album of the Year Award, three months after winning the Grammy Award for Album of the Year. Colombian singer Shakira was named Pop Female Artist for the third time. The Regional/Mexican field was dominated for second year in a row by Mexican singer Pepe Aguilar who won Male Artist and Album of the Year; his father, performer Antonio Aguilar, received the Excellence Award at the ceremony.

Notes
 This list is incomplete since there are not enough references to fill the nominees for all categories, only the winners are available and some nominees on a few categories.

Honorary awards
Excellence Award: Antonio Aguilar.
Special Tribute: Cristian Castro.

See also
1999 in Latin music
2000 in Latin music
Latin Grammy Awards of 2000
Grammy Award for Best Latin Pop Album
Grammy Award for Best Merengue Album
Grammy Award for Best Traditional Tropical Latin Album

References

2000 music awards
Lo Nuestro Awards by year
2000 in Florida
2000 in Latin music
20th century in Miami
2000s in Miami